Not to be confused with lawyer and poet Joseph Converse Heywood

J. C. Heywood or Carl Heywood (born 1941) is a master printmaker, painter, fibre artist and teacher of printmaking whose work has been shown across North America and Europe

Career
Heywood grew up in Chesley, Hanover and Galt, Ontario (now Cambridge). He studied at the Ontario College of Art, graduating in 1963. At the Ontario College of Art, he learned woodblock printing with Frederick Hagan; and at the end of his fourth year, screen printing which he immediately recognized as the right medium for him. He initially taught art at high school in Ontario, but went on to study etching with Stanley William Hayter at Atelier 17 in Paris from 1967 to 1969. There, he learned a new way of working, technically and aesthetically, from his formal art training at the College. In 1974, he began teaching printmaking at Queen's University at Kingston, working there with Otis Tamasauskas from 1980 on. Among his many students was Julie Voyce. He retired in 2006 to become a Queen’s University Professor Emeritus as he continued to explore and gain new skills through new technologies.

Work
Heywood has concentrated primarily in his work in printmaking reinventing the way a print looks. He has used the techniques of screenprint, etching, lithography, vectographs and digital prints and combined them, if he wishes, to this end. He is a printmaker who has enjoyed spending time proofing, trying out, and comparing all the implications of images, fixing the sum of this experience into the final print. Often in his work, he has referred to those he feels are the art historical predecessors in his practice, the Cubists and Kurt Schwitters.

Printmaking allows total freedom and control of colour, he believes. Colour is selected through thought and experiment. The nature of printing inks is adaptable and gives options: they can have the "delicate transparency of watercolour, the solid opacity of gouache, the buttery richness of oil paint, the intensity of sign paint, the purity of coloured light filters", he said in 1984.

Heywood has worked in a wide variety of print studios in Japan, Germany, France and India, besides Canada. He has extensive experience in terms of exhibition, lecturing, as a juror and as an assessor for universities. In 1995, he began a quilt-making project using his prints as a basis for quilts. A major retrospective of his work titled J. C. Heywood: A Life in Layers was organized by Geraldine Davis with help from Linda Belshaw Beatty for the Burnaby Art Gallery in 2008. His work is in many public collections such as the National Gallery of Canada in Ottawa, the Victoria and Albert Museum in London, and the Musée d'Art Moderne de Paris. A full list of the many collections that Heywood's works are in was given in the catalogue for his retrospective in 2008.

Since moving from Kingston to Montreal in 2006, J. C. Heywood has pursued painting, applying to it his 40 years of printmaking methodology.

References

Further reading 
 
 
 
 

Living people
1941 births
Artists from Toronto
OCAD University alumni
Academic staff of Queen's University at Kingston
Canadian printmakers
Canadian etchers
Canadian male painters
20th-century Canadian painters
20th-century printmakers
21st-century printmakers
20th-century Canadian male artists
Atelier 17 alumni
Canadian abstract artists